Obre Lake/North of Sixty Water Aerodrome  on Obre Lake, Northwest Territories, Canada is adjacent to the lodge. The aerodrome is open from the middle of June until October.

See also
 Obre Lake/North of Sixty Airport

References

Registered aerodromes in the North Slave Region
Seaplane bases in the Northwest Territories